Yangmiao Township is a township in Taikang County, Henan, China. , it administers the following thirty villages:
Xijie Village
Konglou Village
Lüzhuang Village
Gezhuang Village
Xizhang Village
Nanjie Village
Qilou Village
Hanzhuang Village
Caozhuang Village
Dawangzhuang Village
Mazhuang Village
Panglou Village
Chenzhuang Village
Houdian Village
Dongjie Village
Chenliuzhang Village
Junying Village
Gengzhuang Village
Xiaoqi Village
Beijie Village
Wangwan Village
Qianjie Village
Hongmiao Village
Niuwangzhuang Village
Houjie Village
Tiefosi Village
Gezhenyuan Village
Lidazhuang Village
Liuzhuang Village
Xiaohe Village

References 

Divisions of Taikang County